Miguel Ángel Carrasco Reyes (born on 10 June 2003) is a Honduran footballer currently playing as a midfielder for Real España.

Career statistics

Club

Notes

References

Living people
2003 births
Honduran footballers
Honduras youth international footballers
Association football midfielders
Liga Nacional de Fútbol Profesional de Honduras players
Real C.D. España players
21st-century Honduran people